Drtno (in older sources Dertno) is a former village in central Slovenia in the Municipality of Lukovica. It is now part of the village of Hribi. It is part of the traditional region of Upper Carniola and is now included in the Central Slovenia Statistical Region.

Geography
Drtno is a small settlement along the upper course of the Bolska River. It lies northwest of the main hamlet in Hribi.

Name
Drtno was attested in written sources as Odertnim in 1571, and in older modern sources it was spelled Dertno. The name is probably derived from Slavic  (poľe) 'cleared field', referring to land that was cleared for farming. Related toponyms include Drtija and Razdrto, as well as various microtoponyms (Drt, Drti, Drtica, Drtiči, Drtičje, Drtine, Drtniki).

History
Drtno had a population of nine (in two houses) in 1900, six (in one house) in 1931, and nine (in two houses) in 1953. It has no residents today. Drtno was annexed by Hribi in 1953, ending its existence as a separate settlement.

References

External links
 
Drtno on Geopedia

Populated places in the Municipality of Lukovica
Former settlements in Slovenia